Hüseyin Avni is the name of:

People
 Hüseyin Avni Bey (1875–1915), Ottoman military officer
 Hüseyin Avni Mutlu (born 1956), Turkish civil servant 
 Hüseyin Avni Pasha (1820–1876), Ottoman statesman and grand vizier
 Hüseyin Avni Zaimler (1887–1930), Ottoman military officer and Turkish politician

Other uses
 Hüseyin Avni Aker Stadium, home of the football club Trabzonspor, named after Hüseyin Avni Aker